The Wind in the Willows was an American band which included Debbie Harry as a member. The band took its name from British writer Kenneth Grahame's The Wind in the Willows, a classic of children's literature.

The band's only album, the self-titled The Wind in the Willows (1968, Capitol Records LP2956), grazed the charts at #195. The band broke up shortly after failing to achieve commercial success or critical acclaim. The following year Artie Kornfeld, the producer of the album, went on to be the music producer of the Woodstock festival in 1969. Debbie Harry went on to join The Stillettoes in 1974 and other bands until subsequently achieving success in 1974 fronting the new wave band Blondie.

Wind in the Willows recorded a second album, which was never released. The whereabouts of the tapes are unknown. According to Cathay Che's biography on Harry, it has never surfaced, but Harry was said to have contributed more vocals than on the first album, as well as writing lyrics for a track entitled "Buried Treasure" on the second album.

The Wind In The Willows
Vinyl
During 1968 the vinyl album was released in "Unipak" gatefold format in the U.S. (Capitol Records, SKAO-2956).  The vinyl LP was also released in the UK, Canada, Australia, Brazil, and Germany.

Compact disc
During 1993 in the UK the album was released in mono on compact disc by Drop Out Records.

The album was digitally remastered and released on compact disc in the UK by Edsel Records in on 8 March 2000.

On 6 March 2007 the original vinyl album was reissued on compact disc, without being remastered, by the Fallout Record label in the UK.

Track listing
Side One
"Moments Spent" (Paul Klein, Stephen De Phillips)  2:56
"Uptown Girl" (Paul Klein, Art Petzal)  2:55
"So Sad (To Watch Good Love Go Bad)" (Don Everly)  3:12
"My Uncle Used to Love Me But She Died" (Roger Miller)  2:15
"There Is But One Truth, Daddy" (Paul Klein)  8:18

Side Two
"The Friendly Lion" (Paul Klein, Wayne Kirby)  3:18
"Park Avenue Blues" (Paul Klein, Stephen De Phillips)  3:45
"Djini Judy" (Paul Klein, Wayne Kirby)  2:40
"Little People" (Paul Klein, Wayne Kirby)  4:04
"She's Fantastic and She's Yours"  (Paul Klein, Peter Brittain, Fred Ruvola)  3:43
"Wheel of Changes" (Paul Klein, Peter Brittain)  4:30

Singles

Two singles were released:

Moments Spent (2:55) / Uptown Girl (2:55)
 
This single was released in the United States, Canada, Italy, New Zealand, Brazil, Australia, and Japan.
 
Moments Spent (2:54) / Friendly Lion (3:17)
 
This single was released in the UK and West Germany.

Worldwide Discography

http://www.45cat.com/artist/wind-in-the-willows

Musicians

Wayne Kirby – vocals, double bass, piano, harpsichord, organ, vibes
Deborah Harry – vocals, Acoustic Guitar, tamboura, tambourine, finger cymbals
Ida Andrews – flute, bassoon, piccolo, chimes, vocals
Peter Brittain – lead guitar, vocals
Paul Klein – vocals, guitar
Anton Carysforth – drums
Steve "Marvello" DePhillips – bass, vocals
Freddy – spiritual advisor

Assisting breezes:
Peter C. Leeds – bell tree, "pourer"
Artie Kornfeld – hairy drums, bongos, "bird", a very big bass drum, "toast-er"

Production

Producer – Artie Kornfeld 
String arrangements – Wayne Kirby
Engineer – Brooks Arthur
Recorded at Century Sound, NYC
Manager – Peter C. Leeds
Cover design – Howard Bernstein

References

American rock music groups
Debbie Harry